Turtle Power: The Definitive History of the Teenage Mutant Ninja Turtles is a 2014 documentary about the Teenage Mutant Ninja Turtles franchise directed by Randall Lobb.

Cast

 Peter Laird
 Kevin Eastman
 Mark Askwith
 Richard Rosenbaum
 Ryan Brown
 Michael Dooney
 Steve Lavigne
 Jim Lawson
 Mark Freedman
 John Handy
 Karl Aaronian
 Fred Wolf
 David Wise
 Steve Varner
 Barry Gordon
 Cam Clarke
 Renae Jacobs
 Townsend Coleman
 James Avery
 Pat Fraley
 Peter Renaday
 Thomas K. Gray
 Bobby Herbeck
 Steve Barron
 Brian Henson
 Michelan Sisti
 Judith Hoag
 Rob Paulsen
 Michael Turney
 Kevin Clash
 Ernie Reyes Jr.
 Austin Gibson
 Charles Knauf
 Michele Ivey
 Stephen Reese
 Cindy Torres
 Michael Ian Black

Development

The film was made to celebrate the 30th anniversary of the franchise. It began development in 2009, with production lasting for five years. Over one-hundred hours of interviews were examined by the filmmakers to determine whether they could be used. The trailer was released on June 11, 2014.

Release

It was released on DVD in the United States on August 12, 2014. It was released four days after the 2014 film in the franchise.

Reception

Flickering Myth awarded the film a score of two out of five stars, saying "not a definitive look, it just about scrapes the surface and that's why it's hard to recommend. It's worth watching because what it does show is great, but it will just leave you wanting more and 99 minutes just isn't enough time to cover a thirty year history." Panels and Pixels awarded it 3.5 out of 5, saying "It's an uneven package and certainly not definitive, but there's enough in there to make it worth watching."

Sequel
Director Randall Lobb confirmed that a sequel is in development.

References

External links 
 

2014 films
Teenage Mutant Ninja Turtles
American documentary films
2014 documentary films
Documentary films about comics
Teenage Mutant Ninja Turtles films
2010s English-language films
2010s American films